Tamara (minor planet designation: 326 Tamara) is a large Main belt asteroid. It is classified as a C-type asteroid and is probably composed of carbonaceous material. It is the largest member and namesake of the Tamara Family, a 264 million year-old sub-family of the collisional Phocaea family.

It was discovered by Johann Palisa on 19 March 1892 in Vienna and is named after Tamar of Georgia. Name was given by Grand Duke George Alexandrovich of Russia.

References

External links 
 
 

000326
Discoveries by Johann Palisa
Named minor planets
000326
18920319